Yakima Sportsman State Park is a public recreation area located on the Yakima River on the east side of the city of Yakima in Yakima County, Washington. The state park is an oasis of green in an otherwise desert region, encompassing  of Yakima River floodplain. The site was initially developed by the Yakima Valley Sportsman's Association in the early 1940s, then deeded to the state in 1945. Park offerings include camping, hiking, picnicking, fishing, and birdwatching.

References

External links 
Yakima Sportsman State Park Washington State Parks and Recreation Commission

State parks of Washington (state)
Parks in Yakima County, Washington
Yakima River
Protected areas established in 1945
1945 establishments in Washington (state)